MV Swift Rescue is a submarine support and rescue vessel (SSRV) that is operated by the Republic of Singapore Navy (RSN). The ship is stationed in Changi Naval Base and has a mixed crew of 27 personnel from the RSN and Swire Pacific Offshore Operations Pte Ltd, the marine arm of Swire Group.

In January 2007, the RSN awarded a design, build, own and operate contract to ST Marine, a subsidiary of ST Engineering. The $400 million contract stipulated a 20-year public private partnership scheme for a submarine rescue system and maintenance service. ST Marine and James Fisher Defence subsequently agreed on a 50-50 joint venture named First Response Marine Pte Ltd to build the ship.

Swift Rescue was launched in November 2008 and was the first ship owned by a Southeast Asian navy to have submarine escape and rescue (SER) capabilities. It is equipped with the deep-submergence rescue vehicle Deep Search and Rescue Six (DSAR 6). DSAR 6 allows for the rapid and effective removal of personnel from submarines in distress and takes approximately 15 minutes to be launched.

Dimensions

Ship 

Swift Rescue was built at ST Marine's Benoi yard. It has a gross tonnage of 4,290. The vessel can carry a crew of 27 members to carry out submarine escape and rescue operations. The free-swimming submersible DSAR 6 (SRV) is operated by a two-member crew and accommodate a maximum of 17 members.

Deck equipment and systems 
DSAR 6 was built on JFD's Deep Search and Rescue (DSAR) 500 Class submarine rescue vehicle platform. The DSAR 6 is launched and recovered at the stern of the main deck and can be done up to Sea State 5. The Transfer Under Pressure (TUP) chamber installed on Swift Rescue can hold a maximum of 40 members. It allows for instant medical treatment provides the transfer of rescued mariners from DSAR 6 to Swift Rescue The Remotely Operated Vehicle (ROV) “Super Spartan” aboard Swift Rescue assists the crew to find and view the exact location of the distressed submarine (DISSUB) and clear the debris around the DISSUB. The vessel has two 50-men enclosed lifeboats and a fast rescue boat.

The helipad on Swift Rescue can support the operations of a single helicopter. The embarked helicopter is used to transfer rescued mariners to land in order to providing better medical care. It also has a DP-2 dynamic positioning system to help keep the in an exact longitude and latitude.
The onboard and underwater systems are monitored and tracked by an integrated navigation and tracking system. The accommodation facilities are provided for 85 personnel. Other facilities include a hospital with 18-single beds, and a mess.

The medical centre is equipped with an 8-bed High Dependency Ward and 10-bed Sick Bay to provide care to critical crewmembers as well as a repression chamber. The repression chamber has a capacity of 40 crewmembers and is equipped with a transfer lock door to prevent changes in the atmospheric pressure of the rescued people.

Power plant 
Swift Rescue is powered by two four-stroke, MAN B&W diesel engines producing  each and driving ducted propellers. She also has three Caterpillar Inc.  diesel generators, and a  emergency generator. The propulsion system also integrates two 1,000kW tunnel bow thrusters and two 420kW stern thrusters for high maneuverability. Swift Rescue can be continually operated without returning to port for approximately 28 days.

Rescue missions 
Swift Rescue has not been involved in any actual submarine rescue operations; the ship has however been involved in other operations, including searches. Swift Rescue participated in the ongoing triennial submarine rescue exercise in the region, Exercise Pacific Reach which involves regional partners such as the United States Navy,Japan Maritime Self-Defense Force, Royal Australian Navy and Republic of Korea Navy. The exercise is primarily meant to build interoperability within the region for submarine rescue capabilities as well as building relations between regional submarine operators and rescue assets. 

On 10 March 2014, Swift Rescue was assigned to aid in the search of the missing Malaysia Airlines Flight 370. Swift Rescue was equipped with underwater sonar and has deep-sea divers aboard the ship. Singapore deployed the submarine rescue vessel along with other military vehicles such as two C-130 military transport planes, a naval helicopter, and two warships, to join the search alongside six other countries. Swift Rescue was deployed from Changi Naval Base with members of the Naval Diving Unit and a medical team.

Swift Rescue was also activated on 29 December 2014 to aid in the search and rescue of Indonesia AirAsia Flight 8501 after the Indonesian Search and Rescue Agency accepted the offer of help from the Singapore authorities. On 14 January 2015, the vessel found the wreckage of the lost airliner at the bottom of the Java Sea. 

Swift Rescue partook in its first submarine search mission after the Indonesian Navy submarine  went missing off the waters of Bali during a torpedo drill on 21 April 2021. Its ROV captured photos of the sunken boat at a depth of 838 metres on 25 April.

References 

Submarine rescue ships
Ships of the Republic of Singapore Navy
2008 ships
Republic of Singapore Navy